Robin Haase was the defending champion but chose not to defend his title.

Cedrik-Marcel Stebe won the title after defeating Carlos Taberner 6–3, 6–3 in the final.

Seeds

Draw

Finals

Top half

Bottom half

References
Main Draw
Qualifying Draw

Sibiu Open - Singles
2017 Singles
2017 in Romanian tennis